Kylie Travis (born 27 April 1970) is an English-born Australian actress known for her leading role in the soap opera Central Park West.

Early life
Travis was born in London, England, the oldest of four sisters. After her birth, her family moved to Australia. She modelled for various agencies in Paris, London, and New York City before taking up acting.

Career
Travis' first major role was in the Aaron Spelling soap opera Models Inc. where she played the part of Julie, a vindictive yet loyal model. After the show was cancelled, she was approached by Darren Star, creator of Melrose Place, from which Models Inc was a spin-off, to star in his new prime time drama Central Park West, in which she played scheming fashion editor, Rachel Dennis.

She then went on to play parts in several motion pictures, including Retroactive, Sanctuary as Rachel Malcolm and Gia.

Personal life
Travis is married to Louis R. Cappelli, a property developer active in Westchester County, New York.

Filmography

Film

Television

References

External links

1966 births
Living people
Australian female models
Australian soap opera actresses